Capital South Wales is a regional radio station owned by Communicorp UK and operated by Global as part of the Capital network. It broadcasts to Cardiff and Newport and the surrounding areas from studios in Cardiff Bay.

History

The station originally took to the air in Cardiff only. Known as CBC (Cardiff Broadcasting Company), the station launched on 11 April 1980 on broadcasting on  FM and  AM. Following the closure of neighbouring Gwent Broadcasting in April 1985, CBC began relaying its service as a temporary measure to southern Gwent on  FM and  AM. This became permanent when CBC re-launched as Red Dragon Radio on 14 October 1985. Initially, there were separate drive time shows for Glamorgan and Gwent, but these were dropped for a single service by the early 1990s.

On 3 January 2011, the station was rebranded from Red Dragon FM to Capital South Wales as part of a merger of owners Global's Hit Music and Galaxy networks to form the Capital FM network. On 6 February 2014, Global Radio announced it would be selling Capital South Wales to Communicorp. Capital's network programming and brand name are retained under a franchise agreement. Global's Heart South Wales station shares facilities at the Capital studios in Cardiff Bay.

On 26 February 2019, Global confirmed the station's local breakfast and weekend shows would be replaced with networked programming from April 2019. The weekday drivetime show was retained alongside news bulletins, traffic updates and advertising.

Coverage area

The  signal, which is the stronger of the two, comes from the transmitter at Wenallt near Cardiff, with the  signal being transmitted from Christchurch in Newport. The signals reach as far out as the South Wales Valleys to the north and part of Bridgend to the west.

Capital South Wales also broadcasts on the NOW Digital South East Wales DAB multiplex and online.

Programming
All networked programming originates from Global's London headquarters, including Capital Breakfast with Roman Kemp. Local programming is produced and broadcast from Global's Cardiff Bay studios from 4-7pm, presented by Josh Andrews and Kally Davies.

News
Global's Newsroom broadcasts hourly regional news updates from 5am-7pm on weekdays and 8am-12 midday at weekends with headlines on the half-hour during Capital Breakfast on weekdays.

The bulletins are produced for Communicorp by Global's Cardiff Bay newsroom, which also produces bulletins for Heart South Wales, Heart North and Mid Wales and Smooth Wales.

Former presenters

Sacha Brooks
 Rich Clarke
Andi Durrant
Jason Harrold
Dave Kelly
Bobby McVay
Vaughan Roderick
Noel Sullivan

References

External links
 

South Wales
Communicorp
Radio stations in Cardiff
Radio stations established in 1980
1980 establishments in Wales